The MV Delight is a Hong Kong-flagged grain carrier. It was attacked and hijacked in the Gulf of Aden in the Arabian Sea off the coast of Yemen in the Horn of Africa by Somali pirates on 18 November 2008 at 2 p.m. The Delight, chartered by the Islamic Republic of Iran Shipping Lines, was carrying a cargo of 36,000 tonnes of wheat, and was heading for Iran's Bandar Abbas port. The 25 crew members are from India (7), Pakistan (2), Philippines (7), Iran (7), Ghana (2). The ship was released on 10 January 2009.

Ransom
On 22 November, India's Directorate General of Shipping announced that communication had been established between the pirates and Islamic Republic of Iran Shipping Lines' Emergency Response Committee.

See also
 Piracy in Somalia

References

Maritime incidents in 2008
Merchant ships of Hong Kong
Piracy in Somalia
1985 ships
Bulk carriers
Ships built by Daewoo Shipbuilding & Marine Engineering